Charles Seymour (1885–1963) was an American academic, historian and President of Yale University.

Charles Seymour may also refer to:

 Charles Seymour, 2nd Baron Seymour of Trowbridge (1621–1665)
 Charles Seymour, 6th Duke of Somerset (1662–1748)
 Charles Seymour (cricketer) (1855–1934), English cricketer
 Charles Gurney Seymour, a fictional character in the political novel First Among Equals, by Jeffrey Archer